Elections for the 13th Bangkok Metropolitan Council were held on 22 May 2022, occurring simultaneously with the 2022 Bangkok gubernatorial election. 50 councilors were be elected to the council, each representing one of the districts of Bangkok. Long delayed due to the 2014 coup d'état, it was the first election to the council in 11 years, since the latest election in 2010.

Results show that opposition parties in the House of Representatives, Pheu Thai and Move Forward, gained the most seats and secured a majority in the Metropolitan Council. Pheu Thai gained 20 seats, while Move Forward gained 14 seats. The Democrat Party, the party which formerly had a majority in the council, won only 9 seats, losing over 36 seats from the last election.

Candidates
In total, over 382 candidates contested in the election. Districts with the most candidates were Dusit and Suan Luang, while Samphanthawong, Taling Chan, Din Daeng, Bang Sue, Phasi Charoen, Nong Khaem, Bang Phlat, and Khan Na Yao had the least candidates running.

Major parties in Thailand, including Pheu Thai Party, Palang Pracharath Party, Move Forward Party, and Thai Sang Thai Party had 50 candidates running in every district of Bangkok. Aswin Kwanmuang, the former governor of Bangkok, along with his Rak Krung Thep group, had 46 candidates running in 46 districts.

Results

References

Elections in Bangkok
2022 elections in Thailand
2022 in Thai politics
May 2022 events in Thailand